David Graeme Garden OBE (born 18 February 1943) is a Scottish comedian, actor, author, artist and television presenter, best known as a member of the Goodies and a regular panellist on I'm Sorry I Haven't a Clue.

Early life and education

R. S. Garden's parents, John and Elizabeth, farmed at Macduff, Banff and Buchan, Aberdeenshire. Garden was educated at Repton School, and studied medicine at Emmanuel College, Cambridge, where he joined the Cambridge University Footlights Dramatic Club and served as its president in 1964, while also performing in the 1964 Footlights revue, Stuff What Dreams Are Made Of at the Edinburgh Festival Fringe.

Garden qualified in medicine at King's College London, but has never practised. Asked how he justified making jokes rather than saving lives, he answered:

Career

Radio

Garden was co-writer and performer in the classic BBC radio comedy sketch show, I'm Sorry, I'll Read That Again, in the late 1960s. Garden was studying medicine during the first few series of the show, this commitment making cast membership difficult for him during the third series as he was following a midwifery course in Plymouth. However, he continued sending in scripts for the radio show by mail, and he rejoined the cast upon his return to his medical studies in London. On several occasions, his medical qualifications are lampooned in the show; in the 25th Anniversary Show, David Hatch asks him if he is still a writer. Garden: "Here's something I wrote this morning". Hatch: "It's a prescription". "Yes," says Garden, "but it's a funny one..."

Garden was a permanent panellist on the long-running BBC Radio improvisation show I'm Sorry I Haven't a Clue, in a cast which included Tim Brooke-Taylor, for almost fifty years. He also starred in and co-wrote, with Barry Cryer, You'll Have Had Your Tea, a direct spin-off of ISIHAC, and has contributed to several books from the series including guides to the game Mornington Crescent.

Garden wrote for and appeared with Barry Cryer and Alison Steadman in the 1989 BBC radio comedy sketch show The Long Hot Satsuma. Garden had a role in Paul B. Davies' 2000 radio play Spy Nozy and the Poets. In 2001 and 2002, Garden wrote for and appeared in the BBC radio comedy sketch show The Right Time, along with Eleanor Bron, Paula Wilcox, Clive Swift, Roger Blake and Neil Innes. He was also script editor for The Hudson and Pepperdine Show.

Garden is chair of the spoof radio game show Beat the Kids. He has also appeared on the UK version of the improvisation television series Whose Line Is It Anyway?, which has a similar format. He was a co-writer of the BBC Radio 4 comedy Giles Wemmbley-Hogg Goes Off, and in 2006, Garden co-devised and appeared on the BBC Radio 4 comedy quiz show, The Unbelievable Truth.

In 2003, Garden wrote the Radio 4 sitcom About a Dog, based on an original idea by Debbie Barham, with a second series in 2007.

Garden has appeared in several of Big Finish's Doctor Who audio dramas. In Bang-Bang-a-Boom! he plays Professor Fassbinder, a parody of Victor Bergman in Space: 1999. In Max Warp he plays TV presenter Geoffrey Vantage, parodying Top Gear presenter Jeremy Clarkson. He also plays Abbot Thelonious (an alias of the Meddling Monk) in the Eighth Doctor audio play The Book of Kells in 2010, and subsequently returns as a recurring antagonist to the Eighth Doctor as the Monk (a role previously played on television by Peter Butterworth.

Television
Garden's best known television work is freeform sitcom The Goodies, which he wrote and performed along with Tim Brooke-Taylor and Bill Oddie from 1970 to 1982. The three appeared in the Amnesty International show A Poke in the Eye (With a Sharp Stick) (during which they sang their hit song "Funky Gibbon"). Garden and Bill Oddie co-wrote many episodes of the television sitcom Doctor in the House, including most of the first series episodes, and all of the second series episodes - as well as co-writing episodes of the subsequent Doctor at Large and Doctor in Charge series. Garden was co-writer and performer in the sketch show Twice a Fortnight with Bill Oddie, Terry Jones, Michael Palin and Jonathan Lynn, and also sketch show Broaden Your Mind with Tim Brooke-Taylor, with Bill Oddie joining the cast for the second series.

In 1982 Garden and Oddie wrote, but did not perform in, a six-part science fiction sitcom called Astronauts for Central which was shown on ITV. The show was set in an international space station in the near future.

Garden was the voice of the title character in Bananaman (1983), in addition to General Blight and Maurice of the Heavy Mob in the children's animated television comedy series, which also featured the rest of the Goodies team. The series parodied comic book super-heroes. Later, Garden wrote for the sitcom Surgical Spirit (1994). Graeme Garden has also presented three series of the BBC's health magazine Bodymatters.

Garden appeared in the political sitcom Yes Minister, in the role of Commander Forrest of the Special Branch in the episode The Death List. He also appeared as a television presenter in the Doctor in the House episode, Doctor on the Box.

He was a regular team captain on the political satire game show If I Ruled the World. Brooke-Taylor appeared as a guest in one episode and during the game "I Couldn't Disagree More" he proposed that it was high time The Goodies episodes were repeated. Garden was obliged by the rules of the game to refute this statement, and replied, "I couldn't disagree more... it was time to repeat them ten, fifteen years ago."

In 2004, Garden and Brooke-Taylor were co-presenters of Channel 4's daytime game show Beat the Nation, in which they indulged in usual game show "banter", but took the quiz itself seriously. It was notable for its use of a "laugh track" instead of a studio audience. Garden has hosted the quiz game Tell the Truth and presented a series of history programmes, A Sense of the Past for Yorkshire Television.

Garden writes and directs for the corporate video company Video Arts, famous for its training films starring John Cleese.

Stage appearances

Garden has a successful stage career, and has acted in several National Theatre productions, as well as London's West End. He has also acted in several BBC Radio 4 comedy drama series, and television drama including Peak Practice and Holby City. Garden appeared with Tim Brooke-Taylor in the theatre production The Unvarnished Truth.

In 1986 he appeared in a production of An Inspector Calls by J B Priestley at the Royal Exchange, Manchester.

Garden wrote a play called The Pocket Orchestra which ran in London in 2006. In August 2006, Garden and Brooke-Taylor joined up to perform at the Edinburgh Fringe in a show which looked back with some nostalgia to their work with the Goodies and in light entertainment.

Personal life 
Garden lives in Oxfordshire with his wife Emma, with whom he has a son, Tom. Garden also has a daughter, Sally, and a son, John, from his previous marriage to Mary Elizabeth Wheatley Grice. His son John "JJ" Garden is the occasional keyboardist for the music group Scissor Sisters, and shares songwriting credit on their 2006 album Ta-Dah.

In 2002, Garden suffered an episode of the condition known as Bell's palsy, where the muscles on one side of the face become paralysed. He was able to continue his work commitments and eventually made a full recovery after some months.

Garden was appointed Officer of the Order of the British Empire (OBE) in the 2011 Birthday Honours for services to light entertainment.

Garden is a patron of the disability charity ENRYCH – formerly Ryder-Cheshire Volunteers. The charity works to enable adults with a physical disability to enjoy culture, leisure, learning and sporting opportunities through partnership with a volunteer.

Bibliography

An incomplete list includes:
 The Best Medicine: Graeme Garden's Book of Medical Humour compiled and illustrated by Graeme Garden, published by Robson Books Ltd., London (1984), 
 The Skylighters
 The Seventh Man
 Graeme Garden's Compendium of Very Silly Games
 Stovold's Mornington Crescent Almanac

Co-written with the other members of The Goodies:
 The Goodies File
 The Goodies Book of Criminal Records
 The Making of The Goodies Disaster Movie

Poetry:

References

External links

 "I'm Sorry I Haven't a Clue" homepage at BBC.co.uk
 
 Graeme Garden – BBC Guide to Comedy
 Graeme Garden – Comedy Zone
 Graeme Garden interview
 Graeme Garden – The Gazetteer for Scotland
 ISIHAC interviews with Tim Brooke-Taylor, Graeme Garden, and Barry Cryer at BBC.co.uk
 Graeme Garden Interview Web Wombat Theatre
 The Origin of Monty Python – mentions Graeme and ISIRTA
 "Stuff What Dreams Are Made Of" – the 1964 Cambridge Footlights Club revue during the time when Graeme Garden was President of the Footlights, as well as being a member of the revue cast
 OBEs all round – Goodies pair honoured
 Graeme Garden thought that OBE letter was a bill
 Birthday Honours List 2011 in pictures
 Goodies pair "thrilled" with OBEs
 
 

1943 births
Living people
People educated at Repton School
Alumni of Emmanuel College, Cambridge
Alumni of King's College London
People from Oxfordshire
Actors from Preston, Lancashire
Scottish banjoists
Scottish cartoonists
Scottish comedy writers
Scottish humorists
Scottish illustrators
Scottish male comedians
Scottish male radio actors
Scottish radio writers
Scottish male stage actors
Scottish male television actors
Scottish television directors
Scottish television writers
Scottish male voice actors
I'm Sorry I Haven't a Clue
Officers of the Order of the British Empire
English people of Scottish descent
20th-century Scottish comedians
21st-century Scottish comedians
British male television writers
Entertainers from Preston, Lancashire